Agriopis leucophaearia, the spring usher, is a moth of the family Geometridae. The species was first described by Michael Denis and Ignaz Schiffermüller in 1775. It is a Palearctic species found from Europe to the Russian Far East, Siberia and Japan, mainly in oak forests and in heathland with low-growing oaks.

The ground colour of the wings is usually whitish. The forewings are nuanced red brown at the base and the tip, with discontinuous black lines associated with areas streaked with black. The hindwings of the underside are stippled black. Some individuals may be more dark (brown and black stains) and there are named variants. See Prout (1912–16). The female is wingless. The male has a wingspan of 10–30 mm. The egg is long-oval, pointed at one end; light grass-green.
The rather stout larva is green with yellow lines and brown dorsal blotches

Adults emerge from overwintering pupae in February and March. The females climb up tree trunks and the males fly weakly to them.

The larvae feed mainly on oak (Quercus) but also on Betula and Rosa.

References

External links 

Spring usher at UKMoths
Lepidoptera of Belgium
Lepiforum e.V.
De Vlinderstichting 

Bistonini
Palearctic Lepidoptera
Moths described in 1775
Taxa named by Michael Denis
Taxa named by Ignaz Schiffermüller